Hildreth Meière (1892–1961) was an American muralist active in the first half of the twentieth century who is especially known for her Art Deco designs. During her 40-year career she completed approximately 100 commissions. She designed murals for office buildings, churches, government centers, theaters, restaurants, cocktail lounges, ocean liners, and world’s fair pavilions, and she worked in a wide variety of mediums, including paint, ceramic tile, glass and marble mosaic, terracotta, wood, metal, and stained glass.  Among her extensive body of work are the iconographic interiors at the Nebraska State Capitol in Lincoln, the dynamic roundels of Dance, Drama, and Song at Radio City Music Hall, the apse and narthex mosaics and stained-glass windows at St. Bartholomew's Episcopal Church (Manhattan), and the decoration of the Great Hall at the National Academy of Sciences in Washington, D.C.

Early life 
Hildreth Meière was born in New York City in 1892.  After graduating from the Academy of the Sacred Heart, a Catholic girls’ boarding school in Manhattan, Meière spent a year in Florence studying painting with an English artist.  The Renaissance frescoes that she saw in Italy had a great impact on the direction her career would take.  As she later wrote, "I fell in love, once and for all, with mural painting and great beautiful walls.”

Meière furthered her studies at the Art Students League of New York, the California School of Fine Arts in San Francisco (now the San Francisco Art Institute), the School of the Art Institute of Chicago, and the School of Applied Design for Women in New York where she participated in design competitions administered by the Beaux-Arts Institute of Design.  During World War I, Meière served her country as a draftsman in the U.S. Navy.

Career
Meière began her career designing costumes and sets for the theater.  In 1921 she was introduced to the architect Bertram Grosvenor Goodhue who gave Meière her first major mural commission, the decoration of the Great Hall at the National Academy of Sciences in Washington, D.C.  Goodhue also selected Meière to design the interiors of the Nebraska State Capitol in Lincoln, Meière’s largest and one of her most important commissions.  Over an eight-year period, she designed decorations for the Capitol vestibule, foyer, rotunda, and senate and house chambers.

Meière went on to design murals for buildings throughout the country, although some of her best work can be found in Manhattan.  She became especially well known for integrating murals within architectural settings.  As she once stated, a good mural “cannot be taken away without hurting the design of the building.”  Although Meière is most closely associated with the Art Deco movement, she was capable of designing in a variety of styles depending on the needs and wishes of her clients.

During World War II, Meière organized a group of artists to paint portable three-panel altarpieces, or triptychs, that The Citizens Committee for the Army and Navy distributed to American military camps, airfields, and ships throughout the world.  More than 500 triptychs were produced and Meière herself painted more than 70.  She also taught first aid for the Red Cross.

Professional organizations
As Meière herself wrote, “I have always been active in professional organizations, believing that we owe some of our time and energies to them."  She was the first woman ever appointed to the New York City Art Commission and she was a founder of the Liturgical Arts Society and served as the organization's first president. She served four terms as President of the National Society of Mural Painters; six terms as First Vice President of the Architectural League of New York; Director of the Municipal Arts Society; Director of the Department of Mural Decoration at the Beaux Arts Institute of Design; member of the Architectural Guild of America; and a board member of the Art Students League, the Municipal Arts Society, the School Art League, and the Advisory Committee of the Cooper Union Art School, all in New York.

Awards and recognition
Meière’s first major award came in recognition of one of her early projects. In 1928, a full six years before the Architectural League of New York admitted female members, the organization awarded Meière a gold medal in Mural Decoration for her work at the Nebraska State Capitol.

The U.S. War Department recognized the work she did with the Citizens Committee for the Army and Navy during World War II.  In 1956, she became the first woman to win the Fine Arts Medal of the American Institute of Architects.  Manhattanville College, Meière's alma mater, presented her with an honorary doctorate in 1953, and in 1959 the school presented here with a distinguished service award.

Selected works 
For a complete list of Hildreth Meière’s work see The Art Deco Murals of Hildreth Meière, Catherine Coleman Brawer and Kathleen Murphy Skolnik. New York City: Andrea Monfried Editions, 2014.

 Painted and gilded gesso decorations for the Great Hall of the National Academy of Sciences in Washington, D.C. 1924
 Interiors, including ceramic tile domes, marble mosaic floors, leather doors, and gold-leaf stenciled designs, for the Nebraska State Capitol, Lincoln, Nebraska, 1924-32
 Glazed ceramic tile decoration for the vaults and apse ceiling at Rockefeller Memorial Chapel, University of Chicago, 1928
 Marble floor mosaics at the Baltimore Trust Building, 1929
 Glass mosaics for the apse and narthex and four stained-glass clerestory windows for the nave at St. Bartholomew's Church, New York City, 1929-56
 Glass mosaics for the arch and ark of the main sanctuary at Temple Emanu-El, New York City, 1929
 Consultant on color and scale for the Red Room on the ground floor of 1 Wall Street (originally the Irving Trust Company Building, later the Bank of New York Mellon Building and now the One Wall Street condominium, New York City, 1931
 Dance, Drama, Song (1932), three metal and enamel roundels for the 50th Street facade of the Radio City Music Hall building at Rockefeller Center, New York City (executed by Oscar Bach)
 Glass mosaic lobby ceiling and tile map for the lobby wall of the AT&T Long Distance Building, New York City, 1932
 Two projects for the 1933 Century of Progress Exposition in Chicago—a large painted mural entitled The Progress of Women through Organization and the terracotta tile floor of a pool for the Communications Court
 Multiple projects for the 1939 New York World’s Fair
 Oil-on-canvas mural for the ocean liner SS President Monroe, commissioned by the United States Maritime Commission and the Section of Painting and Sculpture (1940)
 Inlaid marble alter frontal depicting the Annunciation for the Lady Chapel at St. Patrick's Cathedral, New York, 1942 
 Glass mosaics and majolica frieze at the Cathedral Basilica of Saint Louis, St. Louis, Missouri, 1945-61
 Glass mosaic of the risen Christ for the half-dome of the apse of the Resurrection Chapel at Washington National Cathedral, Washington, D.C., 1951
 Map of the Mississippi in gesso and metal-leaf for the Cabin Class Lounge, SS United States; Meière also worked, along with Austin Purves, Jr., on the over-all design of the ship interiors, 1952
 Three-part marble mosaic mural for the lobby of Prudential Plaza, Newark, New Jersey, 1960

Books

Images

References

External links
 Official website, International Hildreth Meière Association.
 The Great Hall, National Academy of Sciences.

1892 births
1961 deaths
Art Deco artists
Art Students League of New York alumni
American muralists
Yeoman (F) personnel
Mosaic artists
Manhattanville College alumni
20th-century American painters
20th-century American women artists
Women muralists
Section of Painting and Sculpture artists